The 2018 Lakeside World Professional Darts Championship was the 41st World Championship organised by the British Darts Organisation, and the 33rd staging at the Lakeside Country Club at Frimley Green.

Glen Durrant who was the defending men's champion, successfully retained his title, beating Mark McGeeney 7–6 in the final after the match went to a tie break.  Durrant became the fifth player to defend a world title following his first win, after Eric Bristow, Raymond van Barneveld, Adrian Lewis and Gary Anderson. McGeeney became the second man, following Mike Gregory in 1992, to lose a world final having had darts at double to win.

Lisa Ashton who was the defending women's champion, also retained her title with a 3–1 win over Anastasia Dobromyslova.

Durrant recorded the tournament's first 100+ match average since 2014 in his quarter-final victory over Jim Williams.

All four men's quarter-finals went to a deciding set, the first time this had happened since the format was changed so that the quarters were played to best of nine sets. The previous year this happened was 1991, when the quarter-finals were best of seven sets.

Michael Unterbuchner became the first German player to reach the semi-finals of the World Championship, but was beaten 6–4 by Mark McGeeney.

Men's

Format and qualifiers

1–16 in BDO rankings (seeded in first round)
  Glen Durrant (winner)
  Mark McGeeney (runner-up)
  Jamie Hughes (first round)
  Scott Mitchell (second round)
  Ross Montgomery (first round)
  Geert De Vos (second round)
  Wesley Harms (first round)
  Cameron Menzies (first round)
  Jim Williams (quarter-finals)
  Willem Mandigers (second round)
  Richard Veenstra (quarter-finals)
  Dean Reynolds (second round)
  Andy Baetens (quarter-finals)
  Martin Phillips (second round)
  James Hurrell (withdrew) 
  Darryl Fitton (second round)

17–24 in BDO rankings (first round)

25–26 in BDO rankings (preliminary round)

Last Year Finalist not Qualified (preliminary round)
  Danny Noppert (second round)

Replacement Player (first round)
  Richie Edwards (first round)

Regional Table Qualifiers (preliminary round)
  Craig Caldwell (preliminary round)
  David Cameron (preliminary round)
  Joe Chaney (preliminary round)
  Daniel Day (first round)
  Chris Landman (preliminary round)
  Dennis Nilsson (first round)
  Ümit Uygunsözlü (preliminary round)

Regional Playoff Qualifiers (preliminary round)
  Pengiran Mohamed (preliminary round)
  Justin Thompson (first round)

Bridlington Playoff Qualifiers (preliminary round)
  Chris Gilliland (preliminary round)
  Chris Harris (first round)
  Derk Telnekes (first round)
  Michael Unterbuchner (semi-finals)

Draw bracket

Preliminary round
All matches are best of 5 sets.

Last 32

Women's

Format and qualifiers

1–8 in BDO rankings (seeded)
  Deta Hedman (semi-final)
  Aileen de Graaf  (quarter-final)
  Lorraine Winstanley  (quarter-final)
  Lisa Ashton (winner)
  Corrine Hammond  (first round)
  Anastasia Dobromyslova (runner-up)
  Trina Gulliver (semi-final)
  Sharon Prins   (quarter-final)

9–14 in BDO rankings

Playoff Qualifiers
  Rachna David  (first round)
  Vicky Pruim  (first round)

Draw Bracket

Youth
For the fourth consecutive year, a youth final was played on the Lakeside stage during the Championships. In September 2017, the Youth tournament was played down to the final two. The final took place on 11 January, and was contested between 17 year old defending champion  Justin van Tergouw from the Netherlands and 15 year old Killian Heffernan from Ireland. The format was first to three sets.

Representation from different countries
This tables shows the number of players by country (men and women) in the World Championship, the total number including the preliminary round. Fifteen countries were represented in the World Championship at men competition and seven at the women. Overall seventeen countries competed at the World Championship.

Men

Women

References

External links
 BDOdarts.com
 LakesideWorldDarts.co.uk

2018
2018 in darts
2018 in English sport
Sport in Surrey
Frimley Green
BDO World Darts